Cari is an English and Spanish feminine given name and surname. As an English given name, Cari is diminutive form of Caroline and an alternate form of Carrie both derived from Karl. Cari is a Spanish given name that is a short form of Caridad, a derivative of Caritas. Notable people referred to by this name include the following:

Given name
 Cari Beauchamp (born 1951), American author and filmmaker
 Cari Champion (born 1975), American journalist 
 Cari Cucksey, star of the television show Cash and Cari
 Cari Domínguez (handballer) (born 1992), Dominican handball player
 Cari M. Dominguez (born 1949), American administrator
 Cari Elise Fletcher, real name of Fletcher (singer) (born 1994), American actress, singer, and songwriter
 Cari Groce, American tennis coach
 Cari Higgins (born 1976), American racing cyclist
 Cari Johnson (born 1977), Canadian sport shooter
 Cari Lekebusch (born 1972), Swedish music producer
 Cari Lightner woman whose death led her mother to found Mothers Against Drunk Driving in 1980
 Cari Read (born 1970), Canadian synchronised swimmer
 Cari Roccaro (born 1994), American football player 
 Cari Batson Thomas, United States Coast Guard rear admiral
 Caris Tiivel (born 1993), Australian model and beauty queen
 Cari Zalloni (1937–2012), Austrian designer

Nickname
Cari Corrigan, nickname of Catherine Margaret Corrigan (born 1972), American scientist
Cari Q, stagename of Cari Quoyeser (born 1990), American musician

Surname
Gaetano Cari (fl. 18th century), Italian scientific instrument maker
 Joseph Cari Jr. (born 1952), American investor

See also

Cai (surname)
Cali (surname)
Car (surname)
Cara (given name)
Card (surname)
CariDee English
Carie Graves
Caris (name)
Carl (name)
Carli (given name)
Carli (surname)
Caro (surname)
Carpi (surname)
Carr (surname)
Carri
Cary (given name)
Cary (surname)
Chari (surname)
Kari (name)

References

English feminine given names
Spanish feminine given names